The 1952 Yukon general election was held on 20 August 1952 to elect the five members of the Yukon Territorial Council. The council was non-partisan, and worked on the basis of consensus government.

Members

References

1952
1952 elections in Canada
Election
August 1952 events in Canada